Digambara ("sky-clad") is one of the two major schools of Jainism, the other being Śvētāmbara (white-clad). The Sanskrit word Digambara means "sky-clad", referring to their traditional monastic practice of neither possessing nor wearing any clothes.

Digambara and Śvētāmbara traditions have had historical differences ranging from their dress code, their temples and iconography, attitude towards female monastics, their legends, and the texts they consider as important.

Digambara monks cherish the virtue of non-attachment and non-possession of any material goods. Monks carry a community-owned picchi, which is a broom made of fallen peacock feathers for removing and thus saving the life of insects in their path or before they sit.

The Digambara literature can be traced only to the first millennium, with its oldest surviving sacred text being the mid-second century Ṣaṭkhaṅḍāgama "Scripture in Six Parts" of Dharasena (the Moodabidri manuscripts). One of the most important scholar-monks of the Digambara tradition was Kundakunda.

Digambara Jain communities are currently found mainly in most parts of North India in states like Rajasthan, Uttar Pradesh, Delhi, Bihar, Jharkhand, Madhya Pradesh, parts of south Maharashtra and Karnataka. According to Jeffery D. Long, a scholar of Hindu and Jain studies, less than one fifth of all Jains in India have a Digambara heritage.

Nomenclature
According to Heinrich Zimmer, the word Digambara is a combination of two Sanskrit words: dik (दिक्) (space, sky) and ambara (अम्बर) (garment), referring to those whose garments are of the element that fills the four quarters of space.

Origin in traditional accounts
The Digambaras and Svetambaras disagree on how the Digambara subtradition started in Jainism. According to Digambaras, they are the original followers of Mahavira and Svetambaras branched off later in the time of Bhadrabahu when their forecasted twelve-year famine triggered their migration from central India. One group of Jain monks headed west and north towards Rajasthan, while the second group headed south towards Karnataka. The former became Svetambaras and retained their "heretic" beliefs and practices such as wearing "white clothes" they adopted there, say the Digambaras. In contrast, according to Svetambaras, they are the original followers, and Digambaras arose 609 years after the death of Mahavira (about 1st century CE) because of an arrogant man named Sivabhuti who became a Jain monk in a fit of pique after a fight at home. He is accused of starting the Digambara Jain tradition with what Svetambara call as "eight concealments", of rejecting Jain texts preserved by the Svetambara tradition, and misunderstanding the Jain ideology including those related to nuns and clothes. Neither of these explanations can be found in early Jain or non-Jain texts. The earliest version of this Digambara story appears in the 10th century CE, while the earliest version of the Svetambara story appears in the 5th century CE.

History
In 1943, Heinrich Zimmer proposed that the Greek records of 4th-century BCE mention gymnosophists (naked philosophers) which may have links to the tradition of "nude ascetics" claimed by the Digambaras. In 2011, Patrick Olivelle stated that the context in which the Greek records mention gymnosophists include ritual suicide by cremation traceable to ancient Brahmanism, rather than the traditional Jain ritual of embracing death by starvation and taking samadhi by voluntarily sacrificing everything including food and water (sallekhana). Dundas talks about the archeological evidences which indicate that Jain monks moved from the practice of total nudity towards wearing clothes in later period. Tirthankara statues found in Mathura and dated to 2nd-century CE or after are naked. The oldest Tirthankara statue wearing a cloth is dated in 5th century CE. Digamabara statues of tirthankara belonging to Gupta period has half-closed eyes.

In 17th-century, adhyatma movement in Agra led to rise of terapanthi and bisapanthi sub-sects based on the differences over acceptance of authority of bhattarakas. King Jai Singh II (1688-1743) of Amer kingdom built separate temples for the two sub-sects in his newly established capital of Jaipur. Terapanthis, led by scholars like Pandit Todarmal and Banarasidas, rejected the authority of bhattarakas.

Early Jain images from Mathura depict Digambara iconography until late fifth century CE where Svetambara iconography starts appearing.

Lineage 

According to Digambara texts, after liberation of Mahavira, three Anubaddha Kevalīs attained Kevalajñāna (omniscience) sequentially – Gautama Gaņadhara, Acharya Sudharma Swami, and Jambusvami in next 62 years. During the next hundred years, five Āchāryas had complete knowledge of the scriptures, as such, called Śruta Kevalīs, the last of them being Āchārya Bhadrabahu. Spiritual lineage of heads of monastic orders is known as Pattavali. Digambara tradition consider Dharasena to be the 33rd teacher in succession of Gautama, 683 years after the nirvana of Mahavira.

In the Digambara tradition, the following lineage of teachers are revered: Mahavira, Gautama, Kundakunda, Bhadrabahu, Umaswami, Samantabhadra, Siddhasena Divakara, Pujyapada, Manatunga, Virasena, Jinasena, Nemichandra. Kundakunda is considered the most significant scholar monk of the Digambara tradition of Jainism. He authored Prakrit texts such as the Samayasāra and the Pravacanasāra. Other prominent Acharyas of this tradition were, Virasena (author of a commentary on the Dhavala), Samantabhadra and Siddhasena Divakara. The Satkhandagama and Kasayapahuda have major significance in the Digambara tradition.

There have been several Digambara monastic lineages that all trace their descent to Mahavira. The historical linages included Mula Sangha (further vivided into  Nandi, Sena, Simha and Deva Sanghas) and now largely extinct Kashtha Sangha (which included Mathura sangha, ""Lat-Vagad" etc.), Dravida Sangh. The text Darshana-Sara of Devasena discusses the supposed differences among the orders. The Mula sangha orders include Deshiya Gana (Bhattarakas of Shravanabelgola etc.) and Balatkara Gana (Bhattarakas of Humcha, and numerous linages of North/Central India) traditions. The Bhattarakas of Shravanabelagola and Mudbidri belong to Deshiya Gana and the Bhattaraka of Humbaj belongs to the Balatkara Gana.

Scripture and literature
The Digambara sect of Jainism rejects the texts and canonical literature of the Svetambara sect. They believe that the words of Mahavira neither survive nor could be recorded. The original teachings went through a rapid period of decline, state the Digambaras, and Svetambara claims of preserving the sacred knowledge and ancient angas is false.

According to the Digambaras, their 33rd achārya was Dharasena who knew one anga, and he taught these to Pushpadanta and Bhutabali, 683 years after the moksha of Mahavira. That anga was also lost with the death of those two. Dharasena's teachings that have survived are Ṣaṭkhaṅḍāgama (Scripture of Six Parts) and Kasayapahuda (Treatise on the Passions), which were written on palm leaves near a cave in Mount Girnar (Gujarat) and a copy of which with a 12th-century commentary came to Tulu Nadu (south Karnataka). This has survived as the Mudbidri manuscripts, which were used by regional Jains not for reading and study, but as an object of devotional worship for centuries. In the 19th century, the fragile and decaying manuscript was copied and portions of it leaked to scholars between 1896 and 1922 despite objections of Digambara monks. It is considered to be the oldest known Digambara text ultimately traceable to the 2nd-century.

These two oldest known Digambara tradition texts – Satkhandagama and Kasayapahuda – are predominantly a treatise about the soul and Karma theory, written in Prakrit language. Philologically, the text belongs to about the 2nd-century, and has nothing that suggests it is of "immemorial antiquity". In details, the text is quite similar in its teachings to those found in Prajnapana – the 4th upanga – of Svetambaras. Between the two, the poetic meter of Satkhandagama suggests it was composed after the Svetambara text.

Digambaras, unlike Svetambaras, do not have a canon. They do have a quasi-canonical literature grouped into four literary categories called anuyoga (exposition) since the time of the Digambara scholar Rakshita. The prathmanuyoga (first exposition) contains the universal history, the karananuyoga (calculation exposition) contains works on cosmology, the charananuyoga (behaviour exposition) includes texts about proper behaviour for monks and lay people, while the dravyanuyoga (entity exposition) contains metaphysical discussions. In the Digambara tradition, it is not the oldest texts that have survived in its temples and monasteries that attract the most study or reverence, rather it is the late 9th-century Mahapurana (universal history) of Jinasena that is the most revered and cherished. The Mahapurana includes not only religious history, but also the sociological history of the Jaina people – including the Jain caste system and its origins as formulated by Rishabhanatha – from the Digambara Jaina perspective. The Digamabara tradition maintains a long list of revered teachers, and this list includes Kundakunda, Samantabhadra, Pujyapada, Jinasena, Akalanka, Vidyanandi, Somadeva and Asadhara.

Practices

Monasticism

The lifestyle and behavioral conduct of a Digambara monk is guided by a code called mulacara (mulachara). This includes 28 mūla guņas (primary attributes) for the monk. The oldest text containing these norms is the 2nd-century Mulachara attributed to Vattekara, that probably originated in the Mathura region.

These are: 5 mahāvratas (great vows); 5 samitis (restraints); 5 indriya nirodha (control of the five senses); 6 āvaśyakas (essential observations); and 7 niyamas (rules).

Digambara monks do not wear any clothes as it is considered to be parigraha (possession), which ultimately leads to attachment. The monks carry picchi, a broom made up of fallen peacock feathers for removing small insects to avoid causing injury and Kamandalu (the gourd for carrying pure, sterilized water). The head of all monastics is called Āchārya, while the saintly preceptor of saints is the upādhyāya. The Āchārya has 36 primary attributes (mūla guņa) in addition to the 28 mentioned above.

The monks perform kayotsarga daily, in a rigid and immobile posture, with the arms held stiffly down, knees straight, and toes directed forward.

Nuns
Female monastics in Digambara tradition are known as aryikas. Digambara nuns, unlike the monks in their tradition, wear clothes. Given their beliefs such as non-attachment and non-possession, the Digambara tradition has held that women cannot achieve salvation (moksha) as men can, and the best a nun can achieve is to be reborn as a man in the next rebirth. The monks are held to be of higher status than nuns in Digambara monasteries, states Jeffery Long. From the Digambara monk's perspective, both Digambara nuns and Svetambara monastic community are simply more pious Jain layperson, who do not or are unable to fully practice the Jain monastic vows.

Digambara nuns are relatively rare in comparison to the nuns found in Svetambara traditions. According to a 1970s and 1980s survey of Jain subtraditions, there were about 125 Digambara monks in India and 50 Digambara nuns. This compared to 3,400 nuns and 1,200 monks in the Svetambara tradition.

Digambar akhara

The Digambar Akhara, which along with other akharas, also participates in various inter-sectarian (sampradaya) religious activities  including Kumbh Melas, is completely unrelated to Digambar Jain tradition, even though they also practice nudity.

Worship

The Digambara Jains worship completely nude idols of tirthankaras (omniscient beings) and siddha (liberated souls). The tirthankara is represented either seated in yoga posture or standing in the Kayotsarga posture.

Sub-sects

Modern Digambara community is divided into various sub-sects viz. Terapanthi, Bispanthi, Taranpanthi (or Samayiapanthi), Gumanapanthi, Totapanthi and Kanjipanthi. Both the terapanthis and bisapanthis worship with ashta-dravya which includes jal (water), chandan (sandal), akshata (sacred rice), pushp (yellow rice), deep (yellow dry coconut), dhup (kapoor or cloves) and phal (almonds).  Bisapanthi religious practices include aarti and offerings of flowers, fruits and prasad whereas terapanthis don't use them. Bispanthis worship minor gods and goddesses like Yaksha and Yakshini like Bhairava and Kshetrapala whereas terapanthis do not. Bisapanthis accept bhattarakas as their religious leaders but terapanthis do not. Terapanthis occur in large numbers in Rajasthan, Uttar Pradesh and Madhya Pradesh. Bidapanthis are concentrated in Rajasthan, Gujarat, Maharastra and South India.

Differences with Śvētāmbara sect 
According to Digambara texts, after attaining Kevala Jnana (omniscience), arihant (omniscient beings) are free from human needs like hunger, thirst, and sleep. In contrast, Śvētāmbara texts preach that it is not so. According to the Digambara tradition, a soul can attain moksha (liberation) only from the male body with complete nudity being a necessity, while Śvētāmbaras believe that it is possible to attain liberation from a female body, and that renunciation of clothes is not at all necessary.

See also

Nudity in religion
God in Jainism
Kshullak
Jain philosophy
Timeline of Jainism
Digambar Jain Mahasabha

Notes

Sources

External links

 
Nudity in religion
Schools of Jainism